"Don't Talk to Me About Love" is a song by Scottish new wave band Altered Images, released as the first single from their third album, Bite. The single reached the top 10 in three countries; number 7 in the UK, and number 6 in both Ireland and New Zealand. The song was their last major hit, as the next three singles only had moderate to minor chart placings ("Bring Me Closer" was their last single to make the top 40 in the UK and Ireland, peaking at numbers 29 and 17, respectively).

Charts

Weekly charts

Year-end charts

References

1983 songs
1983 singles
Altered Images songs
Song recordings produced by Mike Chapman
Portrait Records singles
Epic Records singles